Bowling Green Independent School District (BGISD) is a school district headquartered in Bowling Green, Kentucky. It includes inner portions of Bowling Green, while outer portions are in Warren County Public Schools.

History
It was created in the 1880s.

Gary Fields was named superintendent in 2015. He expressed support for Kentucky House Bill 563.

Schools
 High schools
 Bowling Green High School
 Eleventh Street Alternative School

 Junior high schools
 Bowling Green Junior High School

 Elementary schools
 Dishman McGinnis
 Parker Bennett Curry
 Potter Gray
 T. C. Cherry
 W. R. McNeill

References

External links
 Bowling Green Independent School District

School districts in Kentucky
Bowling Green, Kentucky
Education in Warren County, Kentucky